Adolf (7 January 1434, Munich - 24 October 1441, Munich) was a German nobleman. He was a Duke of Bavaria-Munich in the House of Wittelsbach.

He was the eldest son of William III, Duke of Bavaria and Margaret of Cleves. His younger brother William of Bavaria-Munich died in infancy. Since William III's brother Ernest and Ernest's son Albert III were available as ruling dukes, Adolf's role was very limited. Having been made a duke at the age of one, he died aged only seven and thus had little effect on the duchy's fortunes.

External link

1434 births
1441 deaths
House of Wittelsbach
15th-century dukes of Bavaria
Burials at Munich Frauenkirche
Sons of monarchs
Royalty and nobility who died as children